Carl Emil Pettersson (23 October 1875 – 12 May 1937) was a Swedish sailor who became king of Tabar Island in Papua New Guinea after he was shipwrecked in 1904.

Early life and early career
Pettersson was one of the six children of Carl Wilhelm and Johanna Pettersson. His father left the family, and Carl went to sea around 1892, at about the age of 17.  Later, around 1898, he ended up in the Bismarck Archipelago of German New Guinea, where he worked for the German trading house, Neuguinea-Compagnie, headquartered in Kokopo.

Shipwreck
On a recruiting trip in the Pacific, Pettersson's vessel, the Herzog Johan Albrecht (Duke Johan Albrecht) sank on Christmas Day 1904, off Tabar Island in New Ireland Province. He was washed ashore near a village and landed in a hibiscus hedge, where he was immediately surrounded by islanders. Though Pettersson was uncommonly strong, he would not have been a match for them. The islanders carried him to their king, and the king's daughter fell in love with him. In 1907 he married Princess Singdo, the daughter of the local king, Lamy. He got a start in the copra trade and managed to create his own coconut plantation that he called Teripax. He became king after the death of his father in law. His nickname among the locals was "Strong Charley", and he was indeed famed for his physical strength. Swedish newspapers printed a series of stories about Pettersson and his adventures.

Later life 

Business went well and he increased his estate with two plantations, first Maragon on Simberi Island and later Londolovit on Lihir Group islands. Pettersson was respectful of local customs and showed concern for his employees, which was unusual at the time. He was therefore very popular with the locals. His marriage with Singdo produced a family of nine children, one of whom died in infancy. His wife died in 1921 of puerperal fever.

In 1922, Pettersson travelled to Sweden, partly to look for a new wife who could look after his children. There, he also visited his old friend Birger Mörner whom he had met in the South Pacific. He then met Anglo-Swedish Jessie Louisa Simpson; together they returned to Tabar Island, where they married in 1923. In Pettersson's absence the plantation had declined, and he was now close to bankruptcy. Additionally, he and his wife both suffered from malaria. He painstakingly rebuilt his plantation, but bad investments and the failing market conditions made it difficult to recover.

Pettersson did however find a gold deposit on Simberi Island which he kept secret for years. Today, the Tabar Group of islands has one of the world's largest gold deposits. His fortunes having changed, he decided to leave the island. His wife Jessie traveled ahead to Australia for medical treatment and then returned to Sweden. She died in Stockholm from malaria and cancer on 19 May 1935. Pettersson's health also deteriorated.

Pettersson left Tabar in 1935 but never returned to Sweden. He died of a heart attack in Sydney, Australia on 12 May 1937.

In popular culture
Carl Pettersson is regarded as the inspiration for Ephraim Longstocking, Pippi's father in Astrid Lindgren's children's series, Pippi Longstocking.
In 2012, film writer Jorn Rossing Jensen reported that Swedish producer Mirijam Johansson, of Sweden's Wanted Pictures, announced at Cannes that she had acquired the rights to Efraim Longstocking and the Cannibal Princess, a film based on a screenplay by Daniel Fridell and Ulf Stark and approved by Saltkråkan, the latter of which holds Lindgren's rights.

Further reading

References 

1875 births
1937 deaths
People from Sollentuna Municipality
Swedish sailors
Emigrants from Sweden to German New Guinea